Lestes uncifer is a species of damselfly in the family Lestidae, the spreadwings. It is known commonly as the sickle spreadwing. It is native to much of the southern half of Africa, where it is widespread. It occurs near swamps and slow-moving streams, sometimes in forested areas. It is not considered to be threatened.

References 

U
Odonata of Africa
Arthropods of Southern Africa
Insects described in 1899
Taxonomy articles created by Polbot